Thomas Zeno Minehart (May 23, 1907 – July 29, 1989) was an American lawyer and politician from the state of Pennsylvania. He was a member of the Philadelphia City Council, chaired the Pennsylvania Democratic Party, and served as Pennsylvania Auditor General and Pennsylvania Treasurer during the 1960s.

Early life and education
Minehart was born on May 23, 1907 to John Minehart and Elizabeth Cosgrove Minehart. He graduated from Temple University and Temple University School of Law. His father had served as a member of the Philadelphia City Council and his uncle, Thomas Z. Minehart, served as a member of the Pennsylvania House of Representatives from 1907 to 1908.

Political career 
In 1936, Minehart was elected to the Philadelphia City Council for the 6th district. Following the reorganization of the City Council in the 1919 city charter, Minehart was the only Democrat on the city council throughout his one term at City Hall. In 1942, he ran for the United States House of Representatives against Hugh Scott, but was defeated taking only 44% of the vote. After his defeat, he took a job as an attorney in the US Office of Price Administration. Minehart later moved to Fort Washington in Montgomery County and continued his law practice after leaving government.

In 1960, Minehart defeated Robert F. Kent, a state representative from Crawford County, in a race for Pennsylvania Auditor General. As auditor, Minehart initiated audits of the suburban counties of Philadelphia and later clashed with Governor William Scranton, a Republican, after the latter took office and fired thirty-two Democrats from state offices. He later declined to approve a purchase of draperies that the governor ordered for a reception.

In 1964, Minehart ran for Pennsylvania Treasurer against Robert D. Fleming, a member of the Pennsylvania State Senate from Pittsburgh. In light of the Democrats' landslide victory in the 1964 presidential election, Minehart had little trouble in dispatching his Republican opponent by 542,000 votes. He served a single four-year term as state treasurer.

In 1966, Minehart supported Bob Casey Sr. in the Democratic primary in the 1966 Pennsylvania gubernatorial election. Casey lost the nomination to Milton Shapp, but Minehart defeated Shapp's preferred candidate, Robert P. Kane, to become chair of the Pennsylvania Democratic Party. As chair, Minehart clashed with Democrats seeking reform of nomination rules after the party awarded Hubert Humphrey the majority of delegates even though Eugene McCarthy won the majority of votes in the 1968 presidential primary election. Minehart appointed a commission to reform the party's rules; however, the committee met only twice and had one public hearing before the committee was effectively shut down.

Personal life 
Minehart was married to Janet Mulvaney and fathered five children. The family resided in Fort Washington, Pennsylvania.

He died on July 29, 1989 in Reading, Pennsylvania, from heart failure.

References

|-

1907 births
1989 deaths
Philadelphia City Council members
Pennsylvania Auditors General
Pennsylvania Democrats
Politicians from Philadelphia
State treasurers of Pennsylvania
Temple University alumni
20th-century American politicians